Makhani (ਮੱਖਣੀ) is a Punjabi word meaning "butter" and may refer to several dishes from Punjabi cuisine:

Dal makhani, made from beans and pulses
Murgh makhani, also known as butter chicken or chicken makhani
Paneer makhani, made from the white cheese paneer, also known as paneer butter masala